Pasqual Verkamp (born 13 October 1997) is a German professional footballer who plays as a winger for Regionalliga club Carl Zeiss Jena.

Career
Verkamp is a former youth academy player of Bayern Alzenau and Darmstadt 98. He started his senior career with Rot-Weiß Darmstadt in German fifth division Hessenliga during 2016–17 season.

On 22 August 2020, Verkamp scored two goals for Carl Zeiss Jena in their 8–2 Thuringian Cup final win against Martinroda. On 30 June 2021, newly promoted 3. Liga club Viktoria Berlin announced the signing of Verkamp on a two-year deal.

On 15 June 2022, Verkamp returned to Carl Zeiss Jena by signing a two-year contract.

Personal life
Verkamp was born in Germany to a Thai father and a German mother.

Honours
Carl Zeiss Jena
 Thuringian Cup: 2019–20

References

External links
 
 

1997 births
Living people
Footballers from Stuttgart
Association football forwards
German footballers
German people of Thai descent
3. Liga players
Regionalliga players
Hessenliga players
Viktoria Aschaffenburg players
FC Carl Zeiss Jena players
FC Viktoria 1889 Berlin players